Prince Bradman Ediriweera (born 19 September 1975) is a Sri Lankan former first-class cricketer whose career as a left-handed batsman and an occasional right-arm medium pace bowler spanned the 1995–96 to 2008–09 seasons.

Playing career
After representing Sri Lanka at youth level, Ediriweera made his first-class debut for Colombo Cricket Club in November 1995. In a 14-year career, he played 113 first-class matches and 58 List A matches. At international level, he played for the Sri Lanka Under-19s and Sri Lanka A but he did not play for the full national team. In domestic cricket, Ediriweera played for five different teams: Colombo CC (1995–2003), Bloomfield CAC (1996–1997), Tamil Union CAC (2003–2006), Sebastianites CAC (2006–2007), and Lankan CC (2008–2009).

References

1975 births
Living people
Cricketers from Colombo
Sri Lankan cricketers
Bloomfield Cricket and Athletic Club cricketers
Colombo Cricket Club cricketers
Lankan Cricket Club cricketers
Sebastianites Cricket and Athletic Club cricketers
Tamil Union Cricket and Athletic Club cricketers